Jean-Raymond Boulle, COR (born 10 October 1950) is a Monaco-based Mauritian businessman, the founder of four publicly traded companies with deposits of nickel, cobalt, copper, zinc, titanium and diamonds.

Career

Early career 
Boulle worked for the De Beers Diamond Trading Company (DTC) for ten years, in Zaire, Sierra Leone and Antwerp, Belgium, and then established Boulle Inc. in Dallas, Texas.

In 1984 he began exploring for diamonds, first in Minnesota, then in Arkansas. In 1987 he formed Arkansas Diamond Development Co., to carry out exploration work on the Crater of Diamonds State Park in Arkansas. He claimed there were perhaps $5 billion worth of diamonds there, but in 1996 exploration work was halted as it was found to be not worth mining.

Diamond Fields and Voisey's Bay
Boulle was chairman, founder and CEO as well as a major shareholder of Diamond Fields Resources (TSE:DFR) which commenced trading on the Vancouver Stock Exchange on 6 April 1993 and, in late 1994, discovered nickel, copper and cobalt ore bodies at Voisey's Bay Mine in Labrador, Canada. The Voisey's Bay Mine deposit was estimated to contain 141 million tonnes at 1.6% nickel. Boulle and Robert Friedland worked together in the vehicle and, in 1996, the Voisey's Bay Mine Project was purchased by Inco for CND$4.3 billion.
Boulle's next company, Diamond Fields International is involved in sea floor mining with interests in mining deposits around the world,.

American Mineral Fields 
His Boulle Mining Group is headquartered in Luxembourg and in 1995 founded American Mineral Fields (later renamed Adastra Minerals), listed on the London Stock Exchange’s Alternative Investment Market and the Toronto Stock Exchange. Adastra Minerals developed mining projects in the Democratic Republic of Congo and a joint venture with the government of the Democratic Republic of Congo to re-treat the Kolwezi tailings project. Adastra Minerals was purchased in August 2006 by First Quantum Minerals, a mining company then with dual listings on the Toronto Stock Exchange and the London Stock Exchange (until 31 May 2016).
In 2001, Boulle acquired the Sierra Rutile Project (a producer of natural rutile) and of the Sierra Minerals SML Bauxite Mine in Sierra Leone, West Africa which became part of Titanium Resources Group, taken public on the London Stock Exchange's Alternative Investment Market in August 2005.

Greenland Gold Resources and Greenland Anorthosite
His mining group's subsidiary company, Greenland Gold Resources Ltd is in Greenland exploring for nickel, copper, cobalt, platinum group elements, titanium and graphite. His other Greenland Company, Greenland Anorthosite, has attracted co-investment from the Danish national investment fund Vækstfonden, the Greenland State investment company Greenland Venture A/S and the Greenlandic pension fund SISA.

Tendyne Holdings
In December 2014, Boulle's company Tendyne Holdings Inc. announced the first successful human Mitral Valve implant at the Royal Brompton Hospital in London, England.

In September 2015, an agreement was reached with Abbott Laboratories to acquire Tendyne Holdings Inc.for a total consideration of US$400 million ($250M plus regulatory-based milestones), excluding Abbott Laboratories’ existing 10% of the company. 

In February 2020, the Tendyne transcatheter mitral heart valve implant which Boulle's Tendyne Holdings Inc. had developed received CE Mark approval from the European Union and became the world's first commercially available solution for Mitral Valve Replacement Technology.

Trained Therapeutix Discovery
‘Trained immunity’: Boulle's company Trained Therapeutix Discovery and its co-founders Professor Mihai Netea and Leo Joosten have revealed that the innate immune systems have adaptive characteristics. This de facto innate immune memory was coined ‘trained immunity’ by Mihai Netea.

In 2022, Boulle and the Spanish Society of Immunology (Sociedad Española de Inmunologia) (“SEI”) founded the Boulle-SEI Awards. The Boulle -SEI International Awards have been founded to acknowledge and support life changing work of today’s health care and life sciences community.

World Titanium Resource 
Boulle Mining Group Luxembourg was the largest shareholder in World Titanium Resources, the Australian Securities Exchange listed discoverers and owners of the Toliara Sands titanium deposit in Madagascar. World Titanium Resources was delisted from ASX on 30 January 2017 and is now privately owned as World Titane Holdings Limited. In December 2017, Base Resources signed a $75m agreement to acquire an 85% interest in the Toliara Sands project in Madagascar from World Titane Holdings Limited.

Omnicane 
Together with the Government of Mauritius, Boulle is one of the three controlling shareholders of Omnicane, a publicly listed company on the Stock Exchange of Mauritius. Omnicane owns sugarcane plantations in Mauritius and produces refined sugar. Omnicane also generates around 30% of the island's electricity for the Grid and 40% of the country's renewable bagasse-based energy.

Raphael Fishing Company 
Boulle is the majority shareholder in the Raphael Fishing Company a 95-year-old company which made legal history in 2008 when it was adjudged a Permanent Grant by the United Kingdom Privy Council on the Thirteen Islands of St Brandon (Cargados Carajos). The Permanent Grant was confirmed by the UK Privy Council in 2008, based on an earlier Permanent Lease (999-year lease) dating back to 1901.

Other work 
In November 2012, entertainment industry media outlet Variety reported that The Jean Boulle Group own the adaption rights for the 1969 counterculture classic film Easy Rider originally released by Columbia Pictures and were part of a consortium including Maurice Fadida’s Kodiak Pictures, Defiant Studios’ Eric B. Fleischman.

Boulle is on the Board of the US based Corporate Council on Africa. Corporate Council on Africa is the 'leading U.S. business association focused solely on connecting business interests between the United States and Africa. CCA uniquely represents a broad cross-section of member companies from small and medium-sized businesses to multinationals as well as U.S. and African firms.'

In 1999 and 2000, Boulle was a 'prime mover in the creation of America's primary governing law on trade with Africa: The African Growth and Opportunity Act (AGOA)'. The African Growth and Opportunity Act (AGOA) provides duty-free treatment to goods of designated sub-Saharan African countries (SSAs) and includes Mauritius. The African Growth and Opportunity Act program promotes economic growth through good governance and free markets. It covers non-textile as well as textile goods and was most recently re-authorized to September 30, 2025.  

In 2002, Boulle sponsored and promoted Mauritius as a venue and helped to organise and contributed to the Second US-SSA AGOA Forum on 13 January 2003.

Conservation

Cargados Carajos 
In April 2016, Boulle's Jean Boulle Group funded and organised a seven-day fact-finding mission in the Mascarene Islands for three of the world's conservation experts to Île Raphael, one of the Thirteen Islands of St. Brandon held in permanent grant by the centenarian Raphael Fishing Company in the Cargados Carajos on the Atoll of St Brandon: Professor Henk Bauwman (Ecotoxicology, Environmental Pollution, Bird Ecology); Professor Tony Martin (world's foremost expert on marine mammals) and Dr. Nick Cole  (herpetologist; MWF Islands Restoration Manager). These experts inspected the St Brandon islands to raise awareness about the need to protect their unique biodiversity and to investigate, for the longer term, the effects of plastic and heavy metal pollution in the Indian Ocean. The St. Brandon Archipelago has been declared an Important Bird Area by BirdLife International.

Mahebourg 
In 2020, in the aftermath of the MV Wakashio oil spill, the Jean Boulle Group enabled the emergency rescue  of three species of rare reptiles (lesser night gecko, Bojer's skink -Gongylomorphus bojerii (Critically Endangered (IUCN 3.1)), Bouton's skink -Cryptoblepharus boutonii) from Mauritius and transported them to the Durrell Wildlife Conservation Trust in Jersey. Moving the reptiles to Jersey offered a lifeline in establishing assurance populations of these animals and their unique genes, well away from the disaster zone until the long-term impacts of the MV Wakashio oil spill are fully understood.

Controversy 
Boulle's America Mineral Fields was accused together with other well known multinational companies of allegedly profiting from Africa's misery (1998) and manipulating African governments (2000) in a draft UN report on alleged illegal exploitation of resources from the Democratic Republic of the Congo. The final United Nations Report S/2003/1027 sent by United Nations Secretary General Kofi A. Annan to the Security Council on 23 October 2003 later dismissed these allegations in relation to the names of several companies, including America Mineral Fields.

Personal life 
Boulle has British nationality. He is a Mauritian citizen, and lives in Monaco. He is married and has two children.

Honours
In 2007, Boulle was made a Commander of the Order of the Rokel, the highest order of merit of Sierra Leone for contributions to the economy of Sierra Leone through the establishment of a titanium and a bauxite mine after the civil war.

  Sierra Leone: Commander of the Order of the Rokel (2007)

See also 
 James P. Allison
 Trained immunity
 Mitral valve replacement
Partridge 1885
Mauritian Wildlife Foundation

References 

1950 births
Businesspeople in metals
Living people
Mauritian expatriates in Monaco
People from Monte Carlo